Kevin Lasagna (born 10 August 1992) is an Italian professional footballer who plays as a striker for  club Hellas Verona.

Club career

Early career 
Born in San Benedetto Po, Lasagna started his career with Governolese near his home town. In 2012, Lasagna signed for Serie D team Cerea and scored 7 times in 35 games throughout the 2012–13 season. Lasagna joined Este for the 2013–14 and scored 21 times in 33 games making him one of the most sought after players of the lower leagues.

Carpi 
In July 2014, Lasagna joined Serie B side Carpi. Lasagna made his Serie B debut on 13 September, as a substitute in the 1–1 draw against Crotone. On 15 November 2014, Lasagna scored his first Carpi goal, wrapping up a 5–2 win against Cittadella, to send Carpi to the top of Serie B.

In January 2017, it was announced that Lasagna would join Udinese for the 2017–18 season and finish the 2016–17 season with Carpi. Udinese reportedly paid Carpi a transfer fee of €4.5 million plus possible bonuses.

Udinese 
Lasagna scored on his debut for Udinese, a 3–2 cup win against Frosinone on 12 August 2017. His first Serie A goal came on 17 September, in a 2–1 loss to Milan. In December, he scored in five consecutive league matches, becoming the first Udinese player to do so since Antonio Di Natale in 2010. He concluded his first season with 14 goals in 32 appearances. 

Lasagna was named club captain in 2019, following the departure of previous captain Valon Behrami from the team. In December 2020, he was replaced in that role by Rodrigo De Paul.

Verona 
On 26 January 2021, Lasagna joined Hellas Verona on a one-and-a-half-year loan deal containing a conditional obligation to buy based on his performances.

International career 
On 9 October 2018, Lasagna was called to the Italy senior team by manager Roberto Mancini as a replacement for the injured Simone Zaza, for the upcoming UEFA Nations League match against Poland on 14 October. He made his senior international debut during the match, coming on as a late substitute in the eventual 1–0 away win, and set up Cristiano Biraghi's injury time winner with a header following a corner, which secured Italy's safety in the group. He made his first start for Italy on 20 November, in a 1–0 friendly win over the United States, held in Genk.

Style of play 
A tall and quick left-footed forward, Lasagna's natural role is that of a main striker in the centre. Lasagna is capable of playing as a second striker, or as a left winger in an attacking trident, due to his ability to both score goals and play off of his teammates. His best qualities are his pace, ball control when dribbling at speed, physical strength, and offensive movement, all of which enable him to lose markers and attack spaces from behind with runs both on and off the ball. He is also known for his striking ability across goal with his left foot while on the run.

Career statistics

Club

International

References

External links 
 
 FIGC Profile 
 

1992 births
Living people
Association football forwards
Italian footballers
A.C. Carpi players
Udinese Calcio players
Hellas Verona F.C. players
Serie A players
Serie B players
Serie D players
Eccellenza players
Sportspeople from the Province of Mantua
Italy international footballers
Footballers from Lombardy